La Cittadella is a 2003 Italian miniseries based on A. J. Cronin's 1937 novel, The Citadel, and produced by Titanus.  It was directed by Fabrizio Costa and stars Massimo Ghini as Dr. Manson and Barbora Bobuľová as his wife, Christine. Other television versions include an American (1960), another Italian (1964), and two British (1960 and 1983)  adaptations.

Plot summary

Cast
 Massimo Ghini as Andrew Manson
 Barbora Bobulova as Christine Barlow 
 Franco Castellano as Danny

Locations
The program was filmed on location in the Czech Republic, London, and Cardiff, Wales.

References

External links 
 
 
 Article about Cronin and the NHS

2000s Italian drama television series
Television shows based on British novels
Period television series
2003 Italian television series debuts
2003 Italian television series endings
Italian medical television series
Television shows based on works by A. J. Cronin
2000s Italian television series